The Bega Valley Shire is a local government area located adjacent to the south-eastern coastline of New South Wales, Australia. The Shire was formed in 1981 with the amalgamation of the Municipality of Bega, Imlay Shire and Mumbulla Shire, with its name deriving from the town of Bega. The shire is also known as the Sapphire Coast for tourism and marketing purposes. During the 2019–20 Australian bushfire season, the area was devastated by fire, with 448 houses being destroyed by fire and approximately 365,000 hectares burned, which is 58% of the Shire's total land mass.

Area
Around 78% of the area belongs to various national parks and state forests. The biggest industry is the production of timber, followed by dairy farming and other agriculture. Smaller industries include fishing, oyster harvesting, and tourism. The Biamanga National Park includes important Aboriginal sites.

Towns and localities
The area extends from Bermagui in the north to the Victorian border in the south and includes the towns of Bega, Tathra, Merimbula, Tura Beach, Wolumla, Cobargo, Bemboka, Pambula, Pambula Beach and the former whaling port, tourism hotspot, and major port of Eden.

Smaller localities include:

Council 
Bega Valley Shire Council is composed of nine councillors elected proportionally as one entire ward. All councillors are elected for a fixed four-year term of office. The mayor is elected by the councillors at the first meeting of the council. The most recent election was held on 4 December 2021, and the makeup of the Council is as follows:

The current Council, elected in 2021, in order of election, is:

Demographics

See also

List of local government areas in New South Wales
Bega Valley Arts and Crafts Society

References

External links
 

 
Local government areas of the South Coast (New South Wales)
South Coast (New South Wales)